The Doctrine of Addai (Syriac: ܡܠܦܢܘܬܐ ܕܐܕܝ ܫܠܝܚܐ Malp̄ānūṯā d-Addai Šlīḥā) is a Syriac Christian text, written in the late 4th or early 5th century CE. It recounts the legend of the Image of Edessa as well as the legendary works of Addai and his disciple Mari in Mesopotamia.

Content 
The story of how King Abgar and Jesus had corresponded was first recounted in the 4th century by the church historian Eusebius of Caesarea in his Ecclesiastical History (i.13 and iii.1) and it was retold in elaborated form by Ephrem the Syrian.

Purpose 
Helmut Koester regards the development of tradition of Thaddaeus' activity in Edessa as part of an effort to build the authority of the orthodox or Palutian faction in Syria against the Manicheans and gnostics, who had an older and stronger presence in the area and traced their lineage to Thomas the Apostle.

Manuscripts 
 ms Saint-Pétersbourg, Bibliothèque Publique Saltykov-Shchedrine, N.S. Syr. 4 (Pigulevskaya 48), f. 1v33
 ms Londres, British Library, Add. 14654, f. 33r-v (fgt) + Add. 14644, f. 1-9v + Add. 14535, f. 1r (fgt) + Add. 12155, f. 53v + Add. 17193, f. 36v-37 (extrait)
 ms Alqosh, Église paroissiale chaldéenne, cod. 87 ?
 ms Londres, British Library, Add. 12161, f. 1v (fgt)
 ms Londres, British Library, Add. 14612, f. 165r (fgt)
 ms Londres, British Library, Add. 14644, f. 1-9v (mutilé du début et au milieu)
 ms Paris, Bibliothèque nationale, syr. 62, f. 102v-108 (extraits)
 ms Birmingham, Selly Oak College Library, Coll. Mingana, Syr. 405, f. 1
 ms Jérusalem, Couvent syrien orthodoxe Saint-Marc, cod. 153, p. 241-259
 Pseudo-Abdias (x. 1)
 Nicephorus (H. E., ii. 7)

Published editions

Modern translations

English 

 
  (HTML version)
  Note: This includes a reprint of the Syriac edition of

Other 

  This also contains an Ethiopian version.
 Dutch: Jan Willem Drijvers, Helena Augusta, waarheid en legende ( Groningen: Rijksuniversiteit Groningen, 1989), pp: 153–157, Note: partielle
 Russian: Elena Nikitična Meščerskaja, Legenda ob Avgare — rannesirijskij literaturnyj pamjatnik: (istoričeskie korni v ėvoljucii apokrifičeskoj legendy) ( Moskva: Nauka, 1984), pp: 185–203
 Armenian: A Carrière, La légende d'Abgar dans l'Histoire d'Arménie de Moïse de Khoren ( Paris: Imprimerie nationale, 1895), pp: 357–414
 Ethiopic: Getatchew Haile, " The Legend of Abgar in Ethiopic Tradition," Orientalia christiana periodica vol. 55 ( 1989), pp: 375–410

See also 
Abgar Legend
Holy Qurbana of Addai and Mari
Early centers of Christianity

Notes

Citations

References

Further reading 
 
Doctrine of Addai  (text, in English)
 
  (HTML version)
  (HTML version)
  (HTML version)

Texts in Syriac
Addai
Oriental Orthodoxy
Christian terminology